Dubomedy Arts is an arts school in the MENA region offering professional training in comedy including stand-up and sketch, improvisation, writing and performance, character development, acting, Arabic comedy, basic circus skills, NYC tap dance and body beats, Emirati language classes. It was founded on April 1, 2008 by Mina Liccione and stand-up comedian and producer Ali Al Sayed.

Ali Al Sayed
Co-founder Ali Al Sayed is a comedian in the MENA region acting as Dubai's first local professional comedian. Al Sayed was named ‘one of the most influential comedians in the world’ by Toastmasters International Magazine and was recently dubbed the “King of Laughter” by Rolling Stone ME. Al Sayed is the founder of local entertainment company Viva Arts and is also the co-director of Dubomedy Arts and producer of the Dubai International Comedy Carnival in the MENA region.

Mina Liccione
Co-founder of  Mina Liccione is a performing artist: comedian, tap dancer, choreographer and arts educator.

DIPAF
In 2010, Dubomedy launched the first international performing arts festival in the UAE entitled the "Dubomedy International Performing Arts Festival" (DIPAF).

References

Performing arts in the United Arab Emirates
Emirati comedy